Chaloem Phan 53 Bridge is a bridge in Bangkok's Yan Nawa sub-district, Sathon district and Si Lom sub-district, Bang Rak District.

History & characteristics
It's the bridge across mouth of Khlong Sathon (คลองสาทร; Sathon canal) on Charoen Krung road, including also a three-way link between Sathon (both North Sathon and South Sathon) and Charoen Krung roads named Chaloem Phan Junction (แยกเฉลิมพันธุ์). Taksin Bridge across Chao Phraya river above and adjacent to the Saphan Taksin BTS station in the side of Bang Rak.

Chaloem Phan 53 Bridge is one of the 17 bridges in the Chaloem bridge series. They are all bridges built each year at various points in Bangkok to commemorate the King Chulalongkorn (Rama V) on his own birthday. For this bridge built on the king’s 53th anniversary, opened on November 15, 1906. Originally, it was not located in the present. It's a wooden bridge built to cross Khlong Wat Sam Chin (คลองวัดสามจีน) at the side of Wat Traimit in the beginning of Yaowarat road (near today's Odeon Circle) Later some parts were demolished for reconstruct to a new bridge like today.

Currently, Chaloem Phan 53 Bridge is one of the three bridges in Chaloem bridge series that are still in their original state and it's still available today. In 1975 it was registered as one of the ancient monuments of Bangkok by the Fine Arts Department.

Nearby places
Sathorn Pier (CEN.)
Taksin Bridge
Saphan Taksin BTS station
Wat Yannawa
Joss House of the Goddess Brahma Met
Robinson Bangrak
Shangri-La Hotel, Bangkok

See also
Chaloem Phao

References

External links

Bang Rak district
Road junctions in Bangkok
Sathon district
Bridges in Bangkok
1906 establishments in Siam
Registered ancient monuments in Bangkok